Kolağası (also written as Kol Ağası, Kol Aghasi) was a military rank of the Ottoman Army. It corresponds to a Senior Captain (modern Turkish: Kıdemli Yüzbaşı) or an Adjutant Major. Kol Ağası is a compound word composed of Kol (column in Turkish) and Ağa (chief in Turkish). 

The rank was junior to the rank Binbaşı (originally corresponding to the Western rank of Lieutenant Colonel until 1934, the Turkish rank Binbaşı was later relegated to Major due to the removal of the rank Kolağası (Önyüzbaşı)), and senior to the rank Yüzbaşı (Captain) in the Ottoman Army and the pre-1934 Turkish Army.

Despite being a single rank, Kolağası was divided in two: Sağ Kolağası (Kolağası of the Right Flank) and Sol Kolağası (Kolağası of the Left Flank). Sağ Kolağası was senior to Sol Kolağası. After the rank of Yüzbaşı (Captain), an officer had to first become Sol Kolağası, before becoming Sağ Kolağası.

The rank of Kolağası was briefly renamed as Önyüzbaşı during the early years of the Turkish Republic, before being completely removed. The collar mark (later shoulder mark) and cap of a Kolağası (Önyüzbaşı) had one stripe and three stars during the early years of the Turkish Republic.

Sources

See also 
Comparative military ranks of World War I
Asakir-i Mansure-i Muhammediye

Military ranks of the Ottoman Empire
Turkish words and phrases